Coleophora angustiorella is a moth of the family Coleophoridae that can be found in southern European countries such as Croatia, Italy, and North Macedonia, Turkey and Armenia.

Adults are on wing in late spring.

References

External links

angustiorella
Moths of Europe
Moths of Asia
Moths described in 1903